HMAS Sprightly was a tugboat operated by the Royal Australian Navy (RAN) between 1943 and 1953.

Construction
She was built by the Levingston Shipbuilding Company, Orange, Texas during 1942.

Operational history
Sprightly was acquired by the Commonwealth Marine Salvage Board in 1942. She was commissioned into the RAN in 1943.

Decommissioning and fate
Sprightly was paid off on 31 March 1958 and was finally sold on 29 August 1969 to T. Korevaar and Sons Pty Ltd, Williamstown, Victoria.

In May 1990 the Sprightly was impounded by the authorities in Loyang OffShore supply Base Singapore for carrying a large amount of firearms and ammunition.

References

Favourite-class tugboats of the Royal Australian Navy
1942 ships
Ships built in Orange, Texas